"Els Segadors" ("The Reapers") is the official national anthem of Catalonia, nationality and autonomous community of Spain.

History

The song describes the event, an uprising of peasants due to the large presence of the Royal army in the Principality of Catalonia, as they were required to lodge and provision the troops, creating a large tension and discomfort and leading to episodes such as religious sacrileges, destruction of personal properties, and rape of women by the soldiers. The second part of the song tells the arrival of the rebel reapers in Barcelona, who kill various guards, the royal officers and the viceroy of Catalonia, Dalmau de Queralt, ending with the exhortation to Catalans to take the arms, as they are at war.

In the 19th century, the text was compiled in the Romancillero Catalán, a book of folk traditions written by Manuel Milà i Fontanals. The music was standardized by Francesc Alió in 1892. Its modern lyrics were written by Emili Guanyavents, who won a competition convened by the political party Unió Catalanista in 1899, simplifying the text to three verses. At the time, the change of lyrics caused some controversy among conservative elements, as Guanyavents, coming from sectors close to anarchism, gave them a revolutionary tone.

Since the beginning of the 20th century, "Els Segadors" became one of the most relevant symbols of catalanism and Catalonia itself, increasing its popularity during the Second Spanish Republic and the Civil War. Despite an attempt of the Generalitat de Catalunya (Catalan autonomous government) in 1931 to replace it with another song, "El Cant del Poble", "Els Segadors" remained highly popular, treated by Catalan government and population as the national anthem. The dictatorship of Francisco Franco (1939-1975) banned the public use of Catalan national symbolism, among them "Els Segadors". Tolerated songs, such as the "Virolai" or "La Santa Espina", were often played in its place to express Catalan identity.

After decades used de facto, sometimes alongside the "Cant de la Senyera", the Catalan government officially adopted "Els Segadors" as the national anthem of Catalonia on 25 February 1993, by law of its parliament. The official version was made in 1994. The new Statute of Autonomy of Catalonia of 2006 confirms this decision by its article 8.4.

Lyrics

Modern lyrics

Original lyrics: pre-1899

Recordings and variations 
Contemporary Catalan composer Jordi Savall made a version of the folk song, using the original narrative (which dates back to the 17th century) combined with the modern lyrics and refrain, which were added later. The song has also been recorded and interpreted by major artists, included on albums such as Traditional Catalan Songs (Victoria de los Ángeles).

In October 2017, in the aftermath of the Catalan independence referendum, the American band A Sound of Thunder released a heavy metal variation of the anthem, using a mix of English and Catalan lyrics.

See also
 Catalan nationalism
 Anthems of the autonomous communities of Spain
 Gernikako Arbola (anthem)

Notes

References

External links

 Generalitat of Catalonia: National symbols

National anthems
Spanish anthems
Regional songs
Catalonia
Catalan culture
Catalan-language songs
Catalan symbols
Reapers' War
National anthem compositions in A minor
National anthem compositions in E minor
National anthem compositions in G minor
Anthems of non-sovereign states